Oscar August Hankner (June 18, 1908 – October 3, 1946) was an American football and basketball coach.  He served as the head football coach at Eureka College in Eureka, Illinois in 1938 and at East Carolina Teachers College—now known as East Carolina University–in 1939, compiling a career college football coaching record 1–14.  He was also the head basketball coach at Eureka from 1937 to 1939, tallying a mark of 13–18.

Hanker was born in Tripoli, Iowa.  He died on October 3, 1946, at Burnham Hospital in Champaign, Illinois, after suffering from an intestinal obstruction.

Head coaching record

Football

References

External links
 

1908 births
1946 deaths
East Carolina Pirates football coaches
Eureka Red Devils athletic directors
Eureka Red Devils football coaches
Eureka Red Devils men's basketball coaches
University of Illinois Urbana-Champaign alumni
People from Bremer County, Iowa
Coaches of American football from Iowa